The Aeroprediction Code is a semi-empirical computer program that estimates the aerodynamics of weapons over the Mach number range 0 to 20, angle of attack range 0 to 90 degrees, and for configurations that have various cross sectional body shapes. Weapons considered include projectiles, missiles, bombs, rockets and mortars. Both static and dynamic aerodynamics are predicted with good accuracy. The code also predicts the trajectory of the weapon using the aerodynamics predicted by the code.

The code may be used to compute the center of pressure and static margin of missiles.

The Defense Acquisition Workforce Improvement Act provides insights into how to use aerodynamic prediction codes such as Aeroprediction in the design of missile for US acquisition.

See also
Missile Datcom

References
1. "Body Alone Aerodynamics of Guided and Unguided Projectiles at Subsonic, Transonic, and Supersonic Mach Numbers", NWL TR-3796, Nov 1972.

2. "Aerodynamic Drag and Lift of General Body Shapes at Subsonic, Transonic, and Supersonic Mach Numbers", AGARD CP-124, AGARD Conference on Aerodynamic Drag, Izmir, Turkey, April 1973.

3. "Aerodynamics of Guided and Unguided Weapons: Part I Theory and Application", NWL TR-3018, Dec 1973 (written with W. McKerley) .

4. "Aerodynamics of Guided and Unguided Weapons: Part II Computer Program and Usage", NWL TR-3036, Jan 1974 (written with W. McKerley) .

5/6 "Static Aerodynamics of Missile Configurations for Mach Number Zero to Three", AIAA Paper No.74-538, Jun 1974 and Journal of Aircraft, Vol. 12, No.10, Oct 1975.

7. "Static and Dynamic Aeroballistics of Projectiles and Missiles", Paper No.9 Presented at the 10th Navy Symposium on Aeroballistics, NSWCDL, Jul 1975 (written with C. Swanson).

8. "The Effect of Boattail Shape on Magnus ", NSWCDL TR-3581, Dec 1976 (co-authored with G. Graff) .
9. "Empirical Method for Predicting the Magnus Characteristics of Spinning Shells ", AIAA Journal, Vol. 15 No.10, Oct 1977, (written with G. Graff) .

10. "Aerodynamics of Tactical Weapons to Mach Number 3 and Angle of Attack 15 Degrees: Part I - Theory and Application", NSWCDL TR-3584, Feb 1977 (written with C. Swanson) .

11. "Aerodynamics of Tactical Weapons to Mach Number 3 and Angle of Attack 15 Degrees: Part II - Computer Program and Usage", NSWCDL TR-3600, Mar 1977 (written with C. Swanson) .

12. "Optimal Projectile Shapes for Minimum Total Drag", NSWCDL TR-3597, May 1977 (written with Hager and F. DeJarnette) .

13. "Dynamic Derivatives for Missile Configurations to Mach Number Three", Journal of Spacecraft and Rockets, Vol. 15, No.4, 1978 (written with C. Swanson) .

14/15. "Aerodynamic Prediction Code for Tactical Weapons", Paper presented at 11th Navy Aeroballistics Symposium, Warminster, PA, 1978 and presented at 17th AIAA Aerospace Sciences Meeting, New Orleans, 1979 (written with L. Devan and J. Sun) .

16. "Aerodynamics Design Manual for Tactical Weapons", NSWC TR 81–156, July 1981 (written with L. Mason, L. Devan and D. McMillan).

17. "Aerodynamics of Tactical Weapons to Mach Number 8 and Angle of Attack of 180 degrees", Paper No.82-0250, presented at AIAA 20th Aerospace Sciences meeting in Orlando, FL, Jan 1982 (written with L. Devan and L. Mason).

18. "Second-Order Shock Expansion Theory Extended to Include Real Gas Effects", NAVSWC TR 90-683, Feb 1992 (written with M. Armistead, S. Rowles and F. DeJarnette) .

19/20. "A New Approximate Method for Calculating Real Gas Effects on Missile Configurations", AIAA Paper No. 92-4637, Atmospheric Flight Mechanics Conference, Aug 1992 (written with Armistead, Rowles, DeJarnette) . Also Journal of Spacecraft and Rockets, Vol. 30, No.1, Jan-Feb 1993.

21. "New Methods for Predicting Nonlinear Lift, Center of Pressure, and Pitching Moment on Missile Configurations", NSWCDD/TR-92/217, Jul1992 (written with T. Hymer and L. Devan) .

22. "A New Semiempirical Method for Computing Nonlinear Angle-of- Attack Aerodynamics on Wing-Body-Tail Configurations", AIAA Paper No.93-0034 presented at 31st Aerospace Sciences Meeting, Jan 1993 (written with L. Devan and T. Hymer) .

23. "Incorporation of Boundary Layer Heating Predictive Methodology into the NAVSWC Aeroprediction Code", NSWCDD TR-93/29, Apr 1993 (written with R. McInville) .

24. "Improved Empirical Model for Base Drag Prediction on Missile Configurations Based on New Wind Tunnel Data", NSWCDD TR-92-509, Oct 1992, (written with F. Wilcox of NASA/LRC and T. Hymer of NSWC) .

25/26. "Base Drag Predictions of Missile Configurations", AIAA Paper No.93-3629 presented at AIAA Atmospheric Flight Mechanics Conference in Monterey, CA, Aug 1993. (Also Journal of Spacecraft and Rockets, Sept-Oct 1994, Vol. 31, No.5) (written with F. Wilcox of NASA/LRC and T. Hymer of NSWC).

27. "Improved Aeroprediction Code: Part I- Summary of New Methods and Comparison with Experiment", NSWCDD TR-93/91, May 1993 (written with T. Hymer and R. McInville) .

28. "Improved Aeroprediction Code: Part II - Computer Program User's Guide and Listing", NSWCDD TR-93/241, Aug 1993, (written with T. Hymer and R. McInville) .

29. "Application of 1993 Version of the Aeroprediction Code (AP93) to Several Missile Configurations", NSWCDD/TR-93/349, Sep 1993 (written with T. Hymer)

30. "Planar Nonlinear Missile Aeroprediction Code for All Mach Numbers", AIAA- Paper No.94-0026, 32nd Aerospace Sciences Meeting, Reno, NV, Jan 1994 (written with R. McInville and T. Hymer) .

31. "A New Semiempirical Method for Computing Nonlinear Missile Aerodynamics", AIAA Journal of Spacecraft and Rockets, Nov-Dec 1993 (written with L. Devan and T. Hymer) .

32. "State-of-the-Art Engineering Aeroprediction Methods with Emphasis on New Semiempirical Techniques for Predicting Nonlinear Aerodynamics on Complete Missile Configurations", NSWCDD/TR-93/551, Nov 1993.

33. "Engineering Codes: State-of-the-Art and New Methods", AGARD Paper No.2 on Missile Aerodynamics Given at Brussels, Belgium and Ankara, Turkey, June 1994.

34. "Incorporation of Boundary Layer Heating Predictive Methodology into the NAVSWC Aeroprediction Code", AIAA Paper No.2001, presented at 6th AIAA/ASME Joint Thermo physics and Heat Transfer Conference, Colorado Springs, CO, June 1994 (written with R. McInville) .

35. "Users guide for an Interactive, Personal Computer Interface for the Aeroprediction Code", NSWCDD/TR-94/107, June 1994 (written with T. Hymer and C. Downs of Vitro) .

36. "A New Method for Calculating Wing Alone Aerodynamics to Angle of Attack 180 Degrees", NSWCDD/TR-94/3, March 1994 (written with R. McInville) .

37. "An Improved Version of the Naval Surface Warfare Center Aeroprediction Code (AP93)", Journal of Spacecraft and Rockets, Sept-Oct 1994, Vol. 31, No.5, pp. 783–791 (written with R. McInville and T. Hymer) .

38. "The 1995 Version of the NSWC Aeroprediction Code:
Part I - Summary of New Theoretical Methodology", NSWCDD/TR-94/379, Feb 1995 (written with R. McInville and T. Hymer) .

39. "The 1995 Version of the NSWC Aeroprediction Code:
Part II - Computer Program Users Guide and Listing", NSWCDD/TR-94, March 1995 (written with T. Hymer and R. McInville) .

40. "Calculation of Wing-Alone Aerodynamics to High Angles of Attack", Journal of Spacecraft and Rockets, Jan-Feb 1995, Vol. 32, No.1, pp. 187–189 (written with R. McInville) .

41. "A New Method for Calculating Wing Alone Aerodynamics to Angle of Attack 180 Degrees", AIAA Paper 95–0757, presented at 33 Aerospace Sciences Meeting, Jan 9–12, 1995 at Reno, NV, (written with R. McInville) .

42. "Extension of the NSWCDD Aeroprediction Code to the Roll Position of 45 Degrees", NSWCDD/TR-95/160, Dec. 1995 (written with R. McInville) .

43. "Extension of the NSWCDD Aeroprediction Code Above Angle of Attack Thirty Degrees", Paper No.96-0065 34th Aerospace Sciences Meeting in Reno, NV, Jan 15–18, 1996 (written with R. McInville and T. Hymer) .

44. "Aeroprediction Code for Angle of Attack Above 30 Degrees", JSR, Vol. 33, No.3, May - June 1996, pp. 366–373, (written with R. McInville and T. Hymer) .

45. "A New Semiempirical Model for Wing-Tail Interference", AIAA Paper No.96-3393, AFM, San Diego, CA, July 29–31, 1996 (written with R. McInville) .

46. "Nonlinear Structural Load Distribution Methodology for the Aeroprediction Code", NSWC TR 96/133, Sept. 1966 (written with R. McInville and C. Housh of NAWCCL) .

47. "Calculation of Wing-Alone Aerodynamics to High Angles of Attack", Journal of Spacecraft and Rockets, Jan-Feb 1995, Vol. 32, No.1, pp. 187–189 (written with R. McInville) .

48. "Aeroprediction Methodology for Roll Positions of 0 and 45 Degrees", paper presented at Session 6B of AIAA Missile Sciences Conference, Monterey, CA, 3–5 December 1996 (Papers archived at DTIC/OCP, 8725 John Ray Kingman Road, Suite 0944, Fort Belvoir, VA 22060–6218) . (written by R. McInville)

49. "New Semiempirical Model for Wing Tail Interference", JSR, Vol. 34, No.1, Jan-Feb 1997, pp. 48–53. (written by R. McInville)

50. "Nonlinear Aeroprediction Methodology for roll Position of 45 Degrees", JSR, Vol. 34 No.1 Jan-Feb 1997, pp. 54–61. (written by R. McInville)

51. "An Improved Method for Predicting Axial Force at High Angle of Attack", NSWCDD/TR96/240, Feb 1997. (written by T. Hymer)

52. "Current Status and Future Plans of the Aeroprediction Code", invited AIAA Paper No.97-2279, 1997 AIAA Applied Aerodynamics conference, 24 June 1997, Atlanta, GA.

53/54. "Methods for distributing Semiempirical, Nonlinear, Aerodynamic Loads on Missile Components", AIAA Paper No. 97-1969, 29th AIAA Fluid Dynamics conference, 30 June-2 July 1997, Snowmass Village, CO (written by R. McInville and C. Housh of NAWCCL and JSR), Vol. 34 No 6 Nov-Dec 1997, pp 744–752.
55. "An Improved Semiempirical Method for Calculating Aerodynamics of Missiles With Noncircular Bodies", NSWCDD/TR-97/20, Sep 97 (written with R.  McInville and T. Hymer) .

56/57. "Improved Methodology for Axial Force Prediction at Angle of Attack, " AIAA Paper 98–0579, 36th Aerospace Sciences Meeting, Jan 1998 and JSR Vol. 35, No.2, March–April 1998, pp 132–139 (written with T. Hymer) .

58. "The 1998 Version of the NSWC Aeroprediction Code : Part I - Summary of New Theoretical methodology", NSWC/TR98/1, Apr 98 (written with R. McInville and T. Hymer) .

59. "A Review of Some Recent New and Improved Semiempirical Aeroprediction methods", paper presented to the Applied Vehicle Technology panel of NATO in Sorrento, Italy, 11–15 May 1998 (written with R. McInville and T. Hymer) .

60. "User's guide for an Interactive Personal Computer Interface for the 1998 Aeroprediction Code (AP98) ", NSWCDD/TR-98/7, Jun 98 (written with T. Hymer and C.Downs) .

61. "The 1998 Version of the NSWCDD Aeroprediction Code: Part II - Program User's Guide and Source Code Listing", NSWCDD/TR-97/73, August 1998 (written with R. McInvi11e and T. Hymer) .

62. "A Robust Method for Calculating Aerodynamics of Noncircular-Cross section Weapons", AIAA Paper 98–4270, pp. 323–340, presented at AIAA AFM Conference, Boston, Massachusetts, Aug 98 (written with R. McInville and T.Hymer) .

63. "Review and Extension of Computational Methods for Noncircular-Cross Section Weapons", JSR, Vol. 35, No.5, Sept-Oct 1998, pp. 584–600 (written with R. McInville and T. Hymer) .

64. "The 1998 Version of the Aeroprediction Code", AIAA Paper 99–0762, AIAA 37th Aerospace -Sciences Meeting, Reno, Nevada, Jan. 1999 (written with R. McInville and T.Hymer) .

65. "A Simplified Method for Predicting Aerodynamics of Multi-Fin Weapons", NSWCDD/TR-99/19, March 1999 (written with R. McInville and D. Robinson) .

66. "Application of the 1998 Version of the Aeroprediction Code", JSR Vol. 36, No.5, Sept-Oct, 1999, pp. 633–645.

67. "Refinements in the Aeroprediction Code Based on Recent Wind Tunnel Data", NSWCDD/TR-99/116, December 1999 (written with R. McInville) .

68. "A Semiempirical method for Predicting Multifin Weapon Aerodynamics", AIAA Paper 2000–0766, 38th Aerospace Sciences Meeting, Reno, NV, Jan 10–13, 2000 (written with R. McInville and D. Robinson) .

69. "Improvements in Pitch Damping for the Aeroprediction Code with Particular Emphasis on Flare Configurations", NSWCDD TR-00/009, April 2000 (written with T. Hymer) .

70. "Modifications to the Aeroprediction Code Based on Recent Test Data", AIAA Paper presented at the AIAA Atmospheric Flight Mechanics Conference, Denver, CO, 14–17 August 2000 (written with R. McInville) .

71. Approximate Methods for Weapon Aerodynamics, Book published by AIAA progress in Astronautics and Aeronautics, Vol 186, August 2000

72.  Improved Power-on, Base Drag Methodology for the Aeroprediction Code," NSWCDD/TR-00/67, Oct 2000. (written with T. Hymer)

73."Semiempirical Prediction of Pitch Damping Moments for Configurations with - Flares," AIAA paper 2001–0101, Reno, NV, Jan 2001 (written with T. Hymer)

74.   "Evaluation and Improvements to the Aeroprediction Code
Based on Recent Test Data," JSR Vol. 37, No.6, Nov.-Dec. 2000, pp. 720–730. (written with R. McInville and T. Hymer)

75. "Semiempirical Prediction of Pitch Damping Moments for Configuration with Flares", JSR Vo138, No. 2, March–April 2001, pps. 150–158.  (written with T. Hymer)

76.  "Improved Power-On, Base Drag Methodology for the Aeroprediction Code," NSWCDD/TR-00/67,May,2001. (written with T. Hymer)

77/78.  "An Improved Semiempirical Method for Power-On Base Drag Prediction," AIAA Paper No.2001-4328, Aug. 2001, and JSR, Vol, No. 1, Jan. – Feb 2002, pp.   (written with T. Hymer)

79.  "A SemiempiricalMethod for Predicting Aerodynamics of Trailing Edge Flaps," NSWCDD/TR 01/30, June 2001 (written with T. Hymer)

80/81.  "A Semiempirical Method for Predicting Aerodynamics of Trailing Edge Flaps", AIAA Paper NO. 2002-4510 Aug. 2002 and JSR, Vol. 40, NO.1, Jan-Feb 2003 (written with T. Hymer).

82.  "The 2002 Version of the Aeroprediction Code: Part I- Summary of New Theoretical Methodology", NSWCDD/TR-01/108, March 2002  (written with T. Hymer)

83."The 2002 version of the Aeroprediction Code: Part II Users Guide", NSWCDD Technical Report in publication  (written with T. Hymer)

84.  "Integration of the Aeroprediction Code with a Point Mass Ballistic Model (TRAMOD) and a Trim Three Degree-of-Freedom Model (MEM)," NSWCDD/ TR-00/77, March 2002 (written with T. Hymer)

85/86.  "The 2002 Version of the Aeroprediction Code", AIAA Paper NO. 2003-26, Jan 6–9, 2003 and JSR, Vol. 41, NO.2, March – April 2004, pps. 232-247 (written with T. Hymer).

87/88.  "An Approximate Method to Estimate Wing Trailing-Edge Bluntness Effects on Normal Force", AIAA Paper NO.  2004-16, Jan. 2004 and JSR Vol. 41, NO. 6, Nov. –Dec. 2004, pps. 932-941 (written with T. Hymer).

89.  "Application of the 2002 Version of the Aeroprediction Code", RAES Aerospace Aerodynamics Research Conference, 10–12 June 2003, London, United Kingdom (written with T. Hymer).

90.  "The 2005 Version of the Aeroprediction Code Part I- Summary of the New Theoretical Methodology", API Report NO. 1,  Jan. 2004 (written with T. Hymer).

91.  "The 2005 Version of the Aeroprediction Code Part II- Users Guide", API Report NO. 2, June 2004 (written with T. Hymer, Cornell Downs, and L Moore).

92/93.  "The 2005 Version of the Aeroprediction Code" AIAA Paper NO. 2004-4715, Aug . 2004 and JSR Vol. 42, No.2, March–April, 2005 (written with T. Hymer).

94/95.  "Improved Aerodynamics for Configurations with Boattails, AIAA Paper Presented at Atmospheric Flight Mechanics Conference Hilton Head Island, SC, August 2007, and JSR, Vol. 45, No. 2, March–April 2008, pps 270-281,(written with L. Moore).

96/97.  "New Methods To Predict Nonlinear Pitch Damping," AIAA Paper presented at 46th AIAA Aerospace Sciences Meeting, Reno, NV, Jan. 2008 and JSR, Vol. 45, No. 3, May–June 2008, pp. 495 – 503 (written with L. Moore).

98/99. "2009 Version of the Aeroprediction Code:  AP09," AIAA paper presented at 47th AIAA Aerospace Sciences Meeting, Orlando, Fl, Jan. 2009 and JSR, Vol. 45, No.4, July- Aug 2008, pp 677–690 (written with L. Moore).

100/101. "New Method  To Predict Nonlinear Roll Damping Moments," AIAA paper presented at the 38th Fluid Dynamics Conference,  Seattle, WA., June 2008, and JSR Vol 45, No. 5, Sept. – Oct. 2008, pp 955 – 964 (written with L. Moore).

102.  "The 2009 Version of the Aeroprediction Code: The AP09", API Report No. 3, Jan. 2008 (written with L. Moore).

References

Aerospace engineering software
Aerodynamics